Khaldoun Abdel-Mutti Khalaf Hamdan Al-Khawaldeh is a Jordanian professional footballer who plays as a right winger for Jordanian club Al-Salt and the Jordan national team.

International career
Khaldoun's first international match with the Jordan national senior team was against Lebanon in the 2014 WAFF Championship on December 26, 2013 at Doha. The match had ended in a 0-0 draw for both teams.

References

External links
 
 

1991 births
Living people
Jordanian footballers
Jordan international footballers
Jordan youth international footballers
Association football defenders
Association football utility players
Al-Faisaly SC players
Al-Sareeh SC players
Shabab Al-Aqaba Club players
Ma'an SC players
Al-Hussein SC (Irbid) players
Al-Salt SC players
Jordanian Pro League players
Sportspeople from Amman